Warren H. Carroll (March 24, 1932 – July 17, 2011) was the founder and first president of Christendom College in Front Royal, Virginia. He authored multiple works of Roman Catholic church history.

Biography
The son of Herbert Allen Carroll and regional writer Gladys Hasty Carroll, Warren Hasty Carroll was born on March 24, 1932 in Maine. He received his B.A. in history from Bates College in 1953 and his M.A. and Ph.D. in history from Columbia University. His younger sister Sarah Watson, who died one month after Warren in 2011, and both of their parents were Bates College graduates.

He served at one time in the CIA's anti-communism division as a Communist propaganda analyst, a job that would later prove most beneficial when writing his comprehensive study of international Communism, Seventy Years of the Communist Revolution (updated and re-released as The Rise and Fall of the Communist Revolution). During 1967-1972 he served on the staff of California State Senator, later U.S. Congressman, John G. Schmitz.

A year after his marriage to Anne Westhoff, Carroll converted from Deism to Catholicism in 1968 and began working for the Catholic magazine Triumph. In 1977 he founded Christendom College with the help of other Catholic laymen, in particular, William H. Marshner, Jeffrey A. Mirus, Raymund P. O'Herron, and Kristin M. Burns. He served as the first president of the college (located in Front Royal, Virginia) until 1985, as well as the chairman of the History Department until his retirement in 2002. At the time of his death, Carroll lived in Manassas, Virginia with his wife Anne, the founder of Seton School (Manassas, Virginia) and Seton Home Study School, as well as the author of Christ the King, Lord of History, as well as Christ in the Americas.

Before his death, he returned to Christendom College each month during the school year to deliver public lectures on select historical topics, ranging from the history of the country of Malta, the Mongol leader Genghis Khan, the French Revolution, and topics from the 20th century, with lectures on Emperor Karl of Austria and the Russian Revolution in 1917. These public lectures are available for free download through iTunes. Carroll remained a member of the Board of Directors and played an active role in helping to guide the college through the years. Carroll died on July 17, 2011 (at the age of 79), after a number of years of dealing with the effects of numerous strokes, and was buried on July 26, 2011, in a grave overlooking the Shenandoah River, behind the college's Regina Coeli Hall, where he spent so much of his time while working at Christendom. On September 16, 2012, Carroll's Celtic cross headstone (inscribed with "Truth exists. The Incarnation happened.") was blessed by college chaplain Fr. Donald Planty.

Awards
Carroll has received numerous awards throughout his academic career. Christendom College, the school he founded, awarded him an honorary doctorate in humane letters in 1999, its Pro Deo et Patria Award for Distinguished Service to God and Country in 2007, and its inaugural Queen Isabel Catholic Vision of History Award in 2007. The Society of Catholic Social Scientists, an organization of which he was a board member, named him its inaugural recipient of the Pius XI Award in history in 1995.

He had published articles through the Society's periodical, the Catholic Social Science Review. Carroll is also known for his major work, the multi-volume "History of Christendom".  At the time of his death, only five volumes had been published; Anne Carroll helped complete the sixth volume, published in the summer of 2013.  Together, the series presents a narrative account of Western Civilization and Catholic history from antiquity (about 2000 BC) through the year 2010.

Books

Non-fiction
Reasons for Hope (1978), co-written with William Marshner, Jeffrey A. Mirus, and Kristin Popik Burns
1917: Red Banners, White Mantle (1981)
Our Lady of Guadalupe and the Conquest of Darkness (1983)
A History of Christendom 
 The Founding of Christendom [to 324] (1985)
 The Building of Christendom [324–1100] (1987)
 The Glory of Christendom [1100–1517] (1993)
 The Cleaving of Christendom [1517–1661] (2000)
 The Revolution against Christendom [1661–1815]  (2005), co-written with Anne Carroll
 The Crisis of Christendom [1815–2005] (2013), co-written with Anne Carroll
The Guillotine and the Cross (1986)
Seventy Years of the Communist Revolution (1989)
Isabel of Spain: The Catholic Queen (1991)
The Rise and Fall of the Communist Revolution (1995)
The Last Crusade: Spain 1936 (1996)
2000 Years of Christianity (2000), co-written with Gloria Thomas

Fiction
The Tarrant Chronicles
The Book of Victor Tarrant
The Book of Victor & Valerie Tarrant (Amazon Kindle e-book only)
The Book of Star Tarrant (Kindle only)  
The Book of Rex Tarrant (Kindle only) 
The Book of Dan Tarrant (Kindle only) 
The Book of All The Tarrants (Kindle only)

See also

References

External links
 Warren H. Carroll – Founder of Christendom College (christendom.edu)
 

1932 births
2011 deaths
Anti-crime activists
Anti-Marxism
Anti-Masonry
Converts to Roman Catholicism
Cold War historians
Historians of the Crusades
Critics of atheism
Federal Bureau of Investigation agents
People of the Central Intelligence Agency
People of the Defense Intelligence Agency
National Security Agency people
Conservatism in the United States
Libertarianism in the United States
Old Right (United States)
Opposition to Fidel Castro
Paleoconservatism
Paleolibertarianism
Reactionary
Right-wing politics in the United States
American anti-communists
American historians of religion
American medievalists
American nationalists
American Roman Catholics
Historians of the Central Intelligence Agency
National Rifle Association
Hoover Institution people
Federalist Society members
John Birch Society members
The Heritage Foundation
John M. Olin Foundation
People from Manassas, Virginia
Columbia Graduate School of Arts and Sciences alumni
Christendom College
20th-century American historians
20th-century American male writers
21st-century American historians
21st-century American male writers
Catholics from Virginia
American male non-fiction writers
Historians from Virginia
Virginia Republicans